Several species of sea urchin share the name green sea urchin:

Lytechinus variegatus, also known as the variegated sea urchin
Psammechinus microtuberculatus, occurs in the Atlantic Ocean, Adriatic Sea, Aegean Sea and Mediterranean 
Psammechinus miliaris, also known as the shore sea urchin
Strongylocentrotus droebachiensis, common in northern waters all around the world